Bobangi can refer to:
Bobangi language, a precursor of the Lingala language
Bobangui, a village in the Central African Republic